The 26th Sarasaviya Awards festival (Sinhala: 26වැනි සරසවිය සම්මාන උලෙළ), presented by the Associated Newspapers of Ceylon Limited, was held to honor the best films of 1996 Sinhala cinema on November 27, 1998, at the Bandaranaike Memorial International Conference Hall, Colombo 07, Sri Lanka. Her Excellency The President Chandrika Kumaratunga was the chief guest at the awards night.

The film Bawa Duka won the nine prestigious awards including Best Film.

Awards

References

Sarasaviya Awards
Sarasaviya